Linda Dégh (18 March 1918 – 19 August 2014) was a folklorist and professor of Folklore & Ethnomusicology at Indiana University, USA. 

Dégh was born in Budapest, Hungary and is well known as a folklorist for her work with legends, identity, and both rural and urban communities in Europe and North America. In 2004, as professor emerita at Indiana University, she was awarded the AFS Lifetime Scholarly Achievement Award. Dégh also served as president of the American Folklore Society in 1982.

Personal
Dégh was born in Budapest, Hungary, on March 18, 1920 and died in Indiana on August 19, 2014. She was married to Andrew Vázsonyi (1906–1986) for 28 years.

Career
Linda Dégh earned her degree from Péter Pázmány University, in Hungary. After graduating, she began teaching at Eötvös Loránd University in the folklore department. In 1965, she began teaching at the Folklore Institute of Indiana University, Bloomington and by 1982, Dégh had become a Distinguished Professor of Folklore and Ethnomusicology at Indiana University.

While teaching, Dégh founded the journal Indiana Folklore in 1968, which she edited until the journal folded. The journal continued publication until 1980 and was the official journal of the Hoosier Folklore Society. She would also serve as president for the Hoosier Folklore Society in 1967 and 1968.

Dégh became a Fellow of the American Folklore Society in 1971. Folklorists are chosen as Fellows of the American Folklore Society for "their outstanding contributions to the field." In 1982, Dégh was the president of the American Folklore Society and in 2004, she was honored by the Society for her work as a folklorist with the Lifetime Scholarly Achievement Award.

Dégh published 18 books and wrote over 200 articles and essays. She is well known for her work with legends and for applying the concept of ostention to the study of contemporary legends. In 1983, she and Andrew Vázsonyi wrote "Does the Word 'Dog' Bite? Ostensive Action: A Means of Legend Telling" and argue that legends can be acted out as well as told. Building on the semiotic work of Ivo Osolsobě, Umberto Eco, Ludwig Wittgenstein and Bertrand Russell, they proposed  five theoretically possible forms of ostention in folklore: ostention, pseudo-ostention, quasi-ostention, false ostention, and proto-ostention.

Awards and honors
1968: American Philosophy Fellowship
1970: Guggenheim Fellowship
1971: Fellow of the American Folklore Society
1984: Fulbright Research Fellowship in Germany
1989: American Folklore Society: Centennial Recognition Award
1990-91: National Humanities Center Fellowship
1991: Hoosier Folklore Society Achievement Award
1993: International Society for the Study of Contemporary Legend Outstanding Contribution Award
1993: Folklore Fellows of the Finnish Academy of Sciences, Helsinki, Finland
1995: Sigillo D'Oro, Pitrè-Salomone Marino Prize, Palermo, Italy
1995: Ortutay Medal - The Hungarian Ethnographic Society Budapest
2002: Chicago Folklore Prize from the American Folklore Society for Legend and Belief: Dialectics of a Folklore Genre
2003: Choice Outstanding Academic Book for Legend and Belief: Dialectics of a Folklore Genre
2004: Lifetime Scholarly Achievement Award from the American Folklore Society

Works

References

1920 births
2014 deaths
Hungarian folklorists
Indiana University faculty
Writers from Budapest
Pázmány Péter Catholic University alumni
Hungarian emigrants to the United States
Presidents of the American Folklore Society